The 62nd annual Berlin International Film Festival was held from 9 to 19 February 2012. British film director Mike Leigh was the President of the Jury. The first five films to be screened in the competition were announced on 19 December 2011. American actress Meryl Streep was presented with the Honorary Golden Bear on 14 February. Benoît Jacquot's film Les adieux à la reine was announced as the opening film. The Golden Bear for Best Film went to the Italian film Caesar Must Die, directed by Paolo and Vittorio Taviani, which also served as closing night film.

Competition

Jury 
The following people were announced as being on the jury for the festival:

International jury
 Mike Leigh, director and screenwriter (United Kingdom) - Jury President
 Anton Corbijn, photographer and director (Netherlands)
 Asghar Farhadi, director, screenwriter and producer (Iran)
 Charlotte Gainsbourg, actress (France)
 Jake Gyllenhaal, actor (United States)
 François Ozon, director and screenwriter (France)
 Boualem Sansal, writer (Algeria)
 Barbara Sukowa, actress (Germany)

Best First Feature Award Jury
 Matthew Modine, actor (United States)
 Hania Mroué, producer and distributor (Lebanon)
 Moritz Rinke, journalist and writer (Germany)

International Short Film Jury
 Sandra Hüller, actress (Germany)
 Emily Jacir, artist and producer (Palestine)
 David O'Reilly, director, screenwriter and producer (Ireland)

In competition 
The following films were in competition for the Golden Bear and Silver Bear awards:

Out of competition

Panorama

Key
{| class="wikitable" width="550" colspan="1"
| style="background:#FFDEAD;" align="center"| †
|Winner of the main award for best film in its section
|-
| colspan="2"| The opening and closing films are screened during the opening and closing ceremonies respectively.
|}

Awards 

The following prizes were awarded by the International Jury:

Golden Bear for Best Film: Caesar Must Die by Paolo and Vittorio Taviani

The Hollywood Reporter described the outcome as "a major upset". Der Spiegel said it was a "very conservative selection." Der Tagesspiegel criticised the outcome, "The jury shunned almost all the contemporary films that were admired or hotly debated at an otherwise pretty remarkable festival."  Paolo Taviani said "We hope that when the film is released to the general public that cinemagoers will say to themselves or even those around them... that even a prisoner with a dreadful sentence, even a life sentence, is and remains a human being". Vittorio Taviani read out the names of the cast.

Silver Bears
 Jury Grand Prix: Just the Wind by Benedek Fliegauf
 Silver Bear for Best Director: Christian Petzold for Barbara
 Silver Bear for Best Actress: Rachel Mwanza for War Witch
 Silver Bear for Best Actor: Mikkel Følsgaard for A Royal Affair
 Silver Bear for Outstanding Artistic Contribution: Lutz Reitemeier for the photography in White Deer Plain
 Silver Bear for Best Script: Nikolaj Arcel and Rasmus Heisterberg for A Royal Affair
 Alfred Bauer Prize for a work of particular innovation: Tabu by Miguel Gomes
 Special Award – Silver Bear: Sister by Ursula Meier

Honorary Golden Bear
 Meryl Streep

Crystal Bears
 Generation Kplus (Feature Length Film): Arcadia by Olivia Silver
 Generation 14plus (Feature Length Film): Night of Silence by Reis Çelik

FIPRESCI Prizes
Competition: Tabu by Miguel Gomes
Panorama: Atomic Age by Héléna Klotz
Forum: Hemel by Sacha Polak

Golden Bear for Best Short Film: Rafa by João Salaviza

References

External links

Yearbook 2012 at berlinale.de
 62nd Berlin International Film Festival 2012

62
2012 film festivals
2012 festivals in Europe
2012 in Berlin
Berl